Framed may refer to:

Common meanings
A painting or photograph that has been placed within a picture frame
Someone falsely shown to be guilty of a crime as part of a frameup

Film and television
Framed (1930 film), a pre-code crime action starring  Evelyn Brent, Regis Toomey and Ralf Harolde
 Framed (1940 film), an American crime film
Framed (1947 film), a film noir starring Glenn Ford and Janis Carter
Framed (1975 film), a crime drama based on a novel starring Joe Don Baker and Conny Van Dyke
Framed (1990 film), HBO made-for-television film starring Jeff Goldblum
Framed (2002 film), TNT made-for-television film starring Rob Lowe
Framed (2009 film), BBC made-for-television film based on the Frank Cottrell Boyce novel
Framed (TV series), a 1992 drama series
Framed (U.S. TV program), an interview series that began in 2008
"Framed" (Spider-Man: 1994 TV series), a 1996 episode of the animated series
"Framed", an episode of Dexter's Laboratory

Literature
 Framed (Cottrell Boyce novel), 2005 children's book by Frank Cottrell Boyce
 Framed!, the first novel in the Traces series by Malcolm Rose
 Framed (Korman novel), 2010 novel by Gordon Korman, the third in the Swindle series

Other uses
Framed (Asleep at the Wheel album), a 1980 album by Asleep at the Wheel
Framed (Sensational Alex Harvey Band album), a 1972 album by The Sensational Alex Harvey Band
"Framed", a song written by Jerry Leiber and Mike Stoller in 1954, also recorded by The Robins, Ritchie Valens, and Cheech & Chong.
 "Framed" (Eminem song), 2018
Framed (video game), a 2014 video game developed by Loveshack

See also
 Framing (disambiguation)
 Frame (disambiguation)